The Indiana Health Law Review is a biannual student-edited law review at Indiana University Robert H. McKinney School of Law. Its primary focus is health law and related topics including bioethics, medical malpractice issues, managed care, competition law, health care organizations, medical-legal research, legal medicine, food and drug issues, and other current health-related legal topics.

External links
 

American law journals
Health law journals
Biannual journals
Publications established in 2004
English-language journals
Indiana University
Law journals edited by students
Indiana University–Purdue University Indianapolis